Anti-Kurdish sentiment, also known as anti-Kurdism or Kurdophobia, is hostility, fear, intolerance or racism against the Kurdish people, Kurdistan, Kurdish culture, or Kurdish languages. A person who holds such positions is sometimes referred to as a "Kurdophobe".

Origin and history

The term 'anti-Kurdism' appears to have been first coined by Gérard Chaliand, who used it to describe anti-Kurdish sentiment in Iraq and Turkey during the mid- to late twentieth century. Much anti-Kurdish sentiment is a result of fears surrounding Kurdish nationalist aspirations for an independent Kurdistan and in response to the ultra-nationalist ideologies promoted by the states which control Kurdistan.

In Turkey, Kurdish identity was officially denied by the state, which sought to Turkify the Kurds in Turkey. Kurdish language and identity are not recognised in the constitution. The Kurdish Flag and teaching the Kurdish language are illegal. Until 2013, the letters Q, W and X were banned because they are present in the Kurdish but not the Turkish alphabet. The Turkish government institutionalized racism and paid academics to teach theories that would deny the existence of Kurds. An example of these is the "kurt-kart theory", which asserted that Kurds were merely Turks whose name came from the "kurt-kart" sound the people made when they walked through the snow of the mountainous southeast of Turkey. Turkish diplomats were taught by the National Secret Service that Kurds nor the Kurdish language exist. The Turkish president Kenan Evren also claimed so during his electoral rallies. Various Turkish nationalist political parties and groups in Turkey have successfully campaigned using the general anti-Kurdish sentiment of the Turkish people. The Turkish state uses "fighting terrorism" to justify military encroachment on Kurdish areas.

Anti-Kurdish sentiment increased in the Arab world during the formation of the United Arab Republic. At that time, Gamal Abdel Nasser implemented a policy of Arabizing the new republic by cracking down on political dissent among Kurds in Syria. Following the collapse of the United Arab Republic, Syria would be officially declared the Syrian Arab Republic based on these same Arab nationalist policies.

Anti-Kurdish sentiment has also been present in Iraq where there is a large Kurdish populations. Anti-Kurdism manifested itself in the form of genocide and Saddam Hussein's Anfal campaign in Iraqi Kurdistan.

Current situation
Kurds in Iraq and Syria were embroiled in a war against the Islamic State of Iraq and the Levant. As a result of the increasing awareness of the Kurdish people due to this conflict, anti-Kurdism has also been on the rise. In the United Kingdom, a Kurdish shop owner was attacked by an Iranian man who advocated genocide against Kurds.

In November 2014, a Kurdish footballer Deniz Naki was the victim of an attack in Turkey. Naki, who played for the Turkish club, Gençlerbirliği S.K., was attacked by Turks while he was out buying food in Turkey's capital, Ankara. The incident occurred shortly after Naki had declared that he was Kurdish and expressed support on social media for the Kurdish groups fighting against ISIS militants. A number of assailants allegedly cursed him and called him a "dirty Kurd" before beating him and injuring his hand and giving him a black eye. Naki has since left Turkey and returned to Europe where he intends to continue his football career.

See also 

 Ba'athism
 Anfal campaign

References

Kurd
Racism
 
Anti-Asian sentiment